Sir William Shelley (1480?–1549) was an English judge.

Life
Born about 1480, he was the eldest son of Sir John Shelley (died 3 Jan. 1526) and his wife Elizabeth (died 31 July 1513), daughter and heir of John de Michelgrove in the parish of Clapham, Sussex. Of the judge's six brothers, one, John, became a knight of the Order of St John, and was killed in defending Rhodes against the Ottoman Turks in 1522; from another, Edward, who is variously given as second, third, or fourth son, came the baronets of Castle Goring, Sussex (created 1806), and Percy Bysshe Shelley, the poet. The youngest brother, John Shelley, died in 1554. The settlement of an estate which he purchased on the dissolution of Sion Monastery led to the lawsuit known as ‘Shelley's case,’ and the decision known as the Rule in Shelley's Case.

Although the eldest son, William was sent to the Inner Temple not to make a profession of law but in order to understand his own affairs, and according to his son it was against his will that he was made serjeant, and judge, by Henry VIII. From the beginning of Henry's reign he appears on commissions of the peace for Sussex and other counties; in 1517 he was autumn reader in the Inner Temple, and about the same time became one of the judges of the sheriff's court in London. In 1520 he was appointed recorder of London, and in May 1521 was placed on the special commission of oyer and terminer to find an indictment against Edward Stafford, 3rd Duke of Buckingham. In the same year he took the degree of the coif.

In 1527 Shelley was raised to the bench as judge of the common pleas, and in 1529 he was sent to demand from Thomas Wolsey the surrender of York House, later Whitehall Palace. Soon afterwards he entertained Henry VIII at Michelgrove.

He was summoned to parliament on 9 August 1529, and again on 27 April 1536. He was hostile to the Protestant Reformation, and is said to have suffered from Thomas Cromwell's antipathy; but his name appears in important state trials of the period: in that of the Carthusian monks and John Fisher (1535), of Weston, Norris, Lord Rochford, and Anne Boleyn (May 1536), and Sir Geoffrey Pole, Sir Edward Neville, and Sir Nicholas Carew (1538–9).

In 1547 he was consulted by Henry VIII's executors about the provisions of his will. He died on 4 January 1549.

Family
Shelley married Alice (died 1536?), daughter of Sir Henry Belknap, grandson of Sir Robert de Bealknap of Knelle in the parish of Beckley, Sussex, Chief Justice of the Common Pleas in his era. By her he had four sons:

 John (died 15 December 1550), father of William (not the same person as William Shelley of Hertford, also a prisoner in the Tower in 1580), who was attainted 15 December 1582 for complicity in Charles Paget's treasons, but not executed, and died 15 April 1597, and John (d.1592), second son, who was succeeded by his son John, created a baronet in 1611; 
 Sir Richard Shelley; 
 the third son, Sir James, was, like Sir Richard, a distinguished and widely travelled Knight of St. John; 
 the fourth, Sir Edward, was a master of the household of Henry VIII, treasurer of the council of the north, and captain of Berwick, and was killed at the battle of Pinkie on 10 September 1547.

Their daughter Elizabeth married Roger Copley, father of Sir Thomas Copley.

References

Notes

Attribution

1480 births
1549 deaths
People from Arun District
English MPs 1523
Recorders of London
Serjeants-at-law (England)
16th-century English judges